Çobanpınarı is a village in the Gerger District, Adıyaman Province, Turkey. The village is populated by Kurds of the Mirdêsî tribe and had a population of 545 in 2021.

The hamlets of Budak, Köşebaşı and Tarlabaşı are attached to Çobanpınarı.

References

Villages in Gerger District
Kurdish settlements in Adıyaman Province